Eastern Acipa (also known as Zubazuba or Səgəmuk) is a Kainji language of Nigeria. It is not close to the language of the same name to its west, though speakers of both are ethnic Acipa. It had 5,000 speakers in 1993. Speakers refer to their language as Tusəgəmuku.

References

Kamuku languages
Languages of Nigeria